Waseem Mushtaq (born 21 April 1984) is an Indian television actor.

Personal life 
Mushtaq is originally from Srinagar. He auditioned for Indian Idol where judge Anu Malik recommended he try his hand at acting.

Television

References

External links
 
 

Living people
1984 births
21st-century Indian male actors
Indian male television actors